E. Miles Prentice, III (born 1942) is an attorney in New York City and owner of minor league baseball teams as well as the chairperson of the Center for Security Policy.

Biography
Prentice was born in New Jersey and received an AB from Washington & Jefferson College in 1964 and his law degree from the University of Michigan in 1967 and was admitted to the bar in New York in 1973.  He is a partner at the law firm Eaton & Van Winkle LLP where his specialty is international and domestic commercial and financial law. His Eaton profile says he has extensive experience in the "acquisition of companies, formation of joint enterprises, transfers of technology, financings (through the public markets and privately, including asset and project-based financings) and general operations." 

Prentice purchased the Midland Angels after the 1989 season. The 1990 Angels program states that he served in the U.S. Army from 1968 through 1970 and that he was raised in Montpelier, Vermont. 

Since the 1990s Prentice has made so far unsuccessful overtures to buy the Kansas City Royals, Milwaukee Brewers, Cincinnati Reds, Boston Red Sox and Houston Astros.  At least one of his bids foundered due to concerns that he was underfinanced.  When he bid for the Royals in 2000, he lost to David Glass even though his offer of $120 million was actually larger than Glass' bid.  However, MLB requires prospective owners to have enough net worth to withstand substantial losses, and Prentice didn't have it.

Policy work
Prentice is the chairman of the Center for Security Policy, a think tank. The organization has been called "neo-conservative" by the Anti-Defamation League and a "hate group" by the Southern Poverty Law Center for alleged anti-Muslim views.

Sports franchises
Norwich Sea Unicorns	
Midland RockHounds (co-owner)

References

External links
http://www.evw.com/attorney/e-miles-prentice/

1942 births
Washington & Jefferson College alumni
University of Michigan Law School alumni
Living people